Milind Chittal is an Indian classical vocalist. Chittal is the son of Kannada writer Yashwant Chittal. He trained under Firoz Dastur of the Kirana Gharana. He is also a qualified chartered accountant.

Career
Chittal's devotional album Enchanting Ram Bhajans was nominated for GiMA awards' for the best devotional album in 2015. He has performed at major music festivals all over India and has also performed abroad in USA, Canada, UK, New Zealand, UAE and Oman. He has given playback for the television serial The Discovery of India produced by Shyam Benegal. He was featured in Surabhi in the year 1998 and the Umang television series in 2011.
Chittal was a member of the Jury for the 3iii International Indian Icon contest 
Milind has recorded music albums for several music companies like Times Music, Magnasound, Mystica Music and Fountain Music.

Discography
 ‘Exuberance’-Ragas Marwa,Kalavati and Jogia by Mystica Music Co. 
 ‘Embracing Krishna’ –Bhajans CD by Mystica Music Co. 
 ‘Thumris of Kirana Gharana’ by Times Music 
 Classical -Ragas Darbari Kanada and Jog -Fountain Music 
 Classical -Ragas Puriya Kalyan and Miyan Ki Malhar-Fountain Music
 Classical -Ragas Ahir Bhairav and Hindol-Fountain Music 
 Classical -Ragas Yaman Kalyan,Basant and Gujari Todi-Fountain Music 
 Classical – Ragas Malkauns,Abhogi Kanada and Shankara-Fountain Music 
 ‘Enchanting Ram bhajans’ –Bhajans CD by Mystica Music Co.

Awards and prizes
Milind Chittal was nominated for Best Devotional Album at the 2015 Global Indian Film Awards

References

1959 births
Hindustani singers
People from Karwar
21st-century Indian male classical singers
Indian accountants
Bhajan singers
Kirana gharana
Living people
Singers from Karnataka
Konkani people
20th-century Indian male classical singers